Linda Crutchfield-Bocock (born 3 April 1942) is a Canadian former alpine skier and luger who competed in the 1964 Winter Olympics and in the 1968 Winter Olympics.

References

1942 births
Living people
Canadian female alpine skiers
Canadian female lugers
Olympic alpine skiers of Canada
Olympic lugers of Canada
Alpine skiers at the 1964 Winter Olympics
Lugers at the 1968 Winter Olympics